Mutual Life Insurance Co. of New York v The Rank Organisation Ltd. [1985] BCLC 11 is a UK company law case dealing with "oppression" (or unfair prejudice) under section 20 Companies Act 1948 (now s.994 Companies Act 2006). Goulding J delivered the first instance judgment.

Facts
United States and Canadian securities law requires registration of companies for share issues. In 1975 Rank Organisation Ltd, an entertainment company, decided to offer 20 million ordinary shares to the public, with a preference to existing Rank shareholders. This preference offer did not however extended to shareholders based in the United States and Canada (including Mutual Life), because it was thought not to be in the company's interest to have to register there. Rank's articles of association stated that directors could allot, deal with or dispose of company shares "on such terms as they think proper". But the American and Canadian shareholders (they owned shares "beneficially" through nominee companies, who were defendants alongside Rank in the case) were still unhappy. They said they had been discriminated against, and that was a "breach of contract" because s.20 of the Companies Act 1948 implied shareholders deserved equal treatment (this is the "oppression" provision; see now, s 994 unfair prejudice).

Judgment
Goulding J dismissed the shareholders' complaint. He held that section 20 did not create a term of the corporate contract that shareholders were to be treated equally in respect of a board resolution (or for that matter a resolution of shareholders in general meeting). The duties of the directors were to exercise their powers to issue shares in good faith, bona fide in the interests of the company and exercise them fairly between shareholders (not necessarily treat shareholders identically).

That is what the directors had done. The treatment of the American and Canadian shareholders was not unfair, because their shareholdings and rights had not been affected. Rank shareholders had no right to expect their share interest remain in constant proportion to the others' in the company forever. The counsel for the petitioners had suggested that a "discriminatory" allotment should only be decided on where no other option were available, but this was clearly going too far to constrain business decisions. Goulding J review all the authorities and summarised (at 24, [1985] BCLC 11),

Notes

United Kingdom company case law
1985 in British law
English good faith case law
1985 in case law